Clitocybe fennica is a species of agaric fungus in the family Tricholomataceae. Found in northern Europe, it was given the Neo-Latin epithet specifying "Finnish" when it was  described as new to science in 1969 by Finnish mycologist Harri Harmaja.

References

External links

fennica
Fungi described in 1969
Fungi of Europe